V22, or similar, may refer to:

 V.22, an ITU-T modem standard
 V22, the ICD-9 V code for normal pregnancy
 The Bell Boeing V-22 Osprey
 The company designation of the Mil Mi-22
 Fokker V.22, a German Fokker D.VII prototype
 Victorious 22, a Los Angeles fashion company